1938 renaming of East Prussian placenames was the process of changing more than 1,500 East Prussian placenames by 16 July 1938, following a decree issued by Gauleiter and Oberpräsident Erich Koch and initiated by Adolf Hitler. This resulted in the elimination, Germanization, or simplification of a number of Old Prussian names, as well as those of Polish or Lithuanian origin. Other areas of Nazi Germany were also affected.

East Prussia

Placenames in Masuria were occasionally renamed prior to 1938, and indeed even before the Nazi era. In the district of Lötzen 47 percent of all villages had already been renamed in the Weimar Republic and another 36 percent after 1933. A systematic renaming campaign was prepared after Koch issued the corresponding order on 25 August 1937. Following this order, the Prussian Ministry of Science, Education and People's Education (Ministerium für Wissenschaft, Erziehung und Volksbildung) set up an expert commission led by Mr Harmjanz (the Ministerialrat or ministerial adviser). Members included Mr Meyer (a Slavicist from Königsberg), Mr Ziesemer (a Germanist from Königsberg), Mr Falkenhayn (a lecturer, expert in Lithuanian and Old Prussian names) and Max Hein (the director of the Königsberg state archives and expert in names of the Teutonic Order state). Affected were names of villages, water bodies, forests and cadastral districts. In some counties up to 70% of the placenames had been changed by 16 July 1938.

After World War II the local populace fled or was expelled. The modern Polish names were determined by the Commission for the Determination of Place Names. The names invented in 1938 remain in official use in Germany.

Silesia and other regions
A similar Germanization of place names was carried out in other regions of Nazi Germany, especially in Silesia. There, 1088 place names in the Oppeln (Opole) region were changed in 1936, also 359 in the Breslau (Wroclaw) area and 178 in the Liegnitz (Legnica) area between 1937 and 1938. In the portion of Upper Silesia which after World War I had become part of the Second Polish Republic, most places had two locally used names, a German one and a Polish one, and after 1922, Polish authorities made the Polish variants the "official" names.

World War II
During World War II, renaming occurred primarily in occupied/annexed territories, because the Nazi government felt that "foreign language names for places constitute a national threat and may lead to mistaken world opinion in regard to their nationality". Areas affected included Polish areas annexed by Nazi Germany, e.g. Upper Silesia and the area near Poznań. and Alsace, as well as Czechoslovakia .

Notes

References

Renaming Of East Prussian Placenames, 1938
East Prussia
East Prussia
Politics of Nazi Germany
Germanization
History of Kaliningrad Oblast
History of Warmian-Masurian Voivodeship